Corchiano is a town and comune in the province of Viterbo, Lazio, central Italy. It was an ancient settlement of the Faliscans and, in the Renaissance and later, a fief of the Farnese family.

The local produce is hazelnuts and wine. Annual sagre include a live re-enactment of the birth of Jesus performed during Advent.

In the summer, a park not far from the centre of the village stays open very late, and the town has several restaurants.

References

Cities and towns in Lazio
Falisci
Italic archaeological sites